Yacine Si Salem (born 10 January 1988) is a French footballer who plays for Kosovan club Besa Pejë as an attacking midfielder.

On 28 January 2007 Si Salem was called up for a training camp with the French Under-21 Futsal team for a 4-day camp. He has 1 cap for the team.

References

External links

1988 births
Living people
People from Souk El Thenine
Kabyle people
Algerian emigrants to France
Algerian footballers
French footballers
French people of Kabyle descent
Association football midfielders
Le Havre AC players
Thrasyvoulos F.C. players
CMS Oissel players
Úrvalsdeild karla (football) players
Liga Portugal 2 players
C.F. Os Belenenses players
Algerian Ligue Professionnelle 1 players
JS Kabylie players
Swiss Challenge League players
Championnat National 2 players
Rodez AF players
Algerian expatriate footballers
Algerian expatriate sportspeople in Greece
Algerian expatriate sportspeople in Portugal
Algerian expatriate sportspeople in Switzerland
French expatriate footballers
French expatriate sportspeople in Greece
French expatriate sportspeople in Portugal
French expatriate sportspeople in Switzerland
Expatriate footballers in Greece
Expatriate footballers in Iceland
Expatriate footballers in Portugal
Expatriate footballers in Switzerland
Grindavík men's football players